Orfevre (foaled May 14, 2008) is a retired Japanese Thoroughbred racehorse and active breeding stallion. In 2011 he won the Japanese Triple Crown and was voted Japanese Horse of the Year. In 2012 he added victories in the Takarazuka Kinen and the Prix Foy but was narrowly beaten in both the Prix de l'Arc de Triomphe and the Japan Cup. He acquired the reputation of being an extremely talented but temperamental racehorse. In 2013 Orfevre again won the Prix Foy and finished second in the Arc before ending his career with an eight length win in the Arima Kinen.

Background
Orfevre (French for "goldsmith") is a chestnut horse with a white blaze, bred by the Shadai Farm in Hokkaido, Japan. His sire Stay Gold, a son of the thirteen time Leading sire in Japan Sunday Silence, was a successful international performer, winning the Dubai Sheema Classic and the Hong Kong Vase. Standing at stud at the Big Red Farm in Hokkaido, he has produced numerous important winners including Dream Journey, Nakayama Festa and Gold Ship. His dam Oriental Art was a daughter of the Hall of Fame inductee Mejiro McQueen and also the dam of Dream Journey. The horse was ridden in Japan by Kenichi Ikezoe while Christophe Soumillon rode the horse in his European races.

Racing career

2010: two-year-old season
Orfevre raced three times as a two-year-old in 2010, winning his first start a 'Newcomer' race (unraced maidens), second in an open class race and 10th in the Grade 2 Keio Hai Nisai Stakes.

2011: three-year-old season

Orfevre was beaten in his first two races in 2011 but won his next six races. In March he won the Spring Stakes at Hanshin Racecourse. A month later he won the Satsuki Sho (Japanese 2000 Guineas), beating the odds-on favourite Sadamu Patek by three lengths. The race had been delayed for a week and moved from Nakayama to Tokyo as a result of the March 11 earthquake. On 29 May, Orfevre took the second leg of the Japanese Triple Crown when he came from well off the pace to beat Win Variation in the Tokyo Yushun (Japanese Derby).

After a break of almost four months, Orfevre returned to the racecourse in September to win the Grade 2 Kobe Shimbun Hai, again beating Win Variation. In October he completed the Triple Crown by winning the Kikuka Sho, with Win Variation finishing second yet again.

On his final start of the year, Orfevre contested the Arima Kinen on 25 December, facing older horses for the first time. The field included Buena Vista, Jaguar Mail, Victoire Pisa, Tosen Jordan and Hiruno d'Amour. Orfevre made a late run on the outside to win by three quarters of a length from Eishin Flash.

2012: four-year-old season
Orfevre lost his first two races at the age of four. In the Grade 2 Hanshin Daishoten on 18 March he was virtually pulled up midway through the race before accelerating again to finish second. He then ran poorly when finishing eleventh in the Tenno Sho on 29 April. In June he returned to form to win the Takarazuka Kinen by two lengths from Rulership.

In the late summer of 2012, Orfevre was sent to Europe to prepare for the Prix de l'Arc de Triomphe. In September he won his trial race by beating Meandre in the Prix Foy over the Arc course and distance. In the Arc de Triomphe he started favourite ahead of the Epsom Derby winner Camelot, despite being given an unfavourable outside draw. Ridden by Christophe Soumillon, he was restrained at the back of the eighteen runner field before making rapid progress on the outside to take the lead in the straight. Orfevre opened up a clear advantage 200 metres from the finish, but then veered sharply right towards the inside rail. In the closing stages he was caught by the filly Solemia and finished second by a neck, seven lengths clear of the other runners.

After returning Japan his next race was the Japan Cup on 24 November. The race saw a close finish between Orfevre and the 2012 Fillies Triple Crown heroine Gentildonna. Orfevre was triple crown champion (male) the previous year. In the last 200 meters, he appeared to haven been bumped off his racing line by Gentildonna who crossed the line a nose to in front of the colt. The subsequent stewards' inquiry found that although interference had taken place, the result was allowed to stand, even though they handed down Gentildonna's jockey Yasunari Iwata a two-day suspension. Orfevre's Arc rival Solemia raced prominently throughout the race, but finished midfield. Despite receiving most fan votes in Arima Kinen, Orfevre's side decided not to field him the race as defending winner, as he had not recovered sufficiently from the Arc and Japan Cup.

At the JRA Awards in January 2013, Orfevre won the JRA Award for Best Older Male Horse, taking 273 of the 289 votes. In the Horse of the Year poll he finished third to Gentildonna and Gold Ship.

2013: five-year-old season
On his five-year-old debut, Orfevre ran in the Sankei Osaka Hai at Hanshin on 31 March. He started the 1/5 favourite and won from Shonan Mighty and Eishin Flash. Orfevre was expected to defend the Takarazuka Kinen on 23 June, but a nine days before the race he bled after an exercise gallop. After exercise-induced pulmonary hemorrhage was diagnosed, Ikee decided to withdraw the horse from the race and target the Arc again.

As in the previous year, Orfevre was sent to Europe in the autumn on 2013 and ran in the Prix Foy as his trial race for the Arc. On 15 September he started as 4/6 favorite against eight opponents including Dunaden after the late withdrawal of Camelot. Ridden by Soumillon, he took the lead 200 metres from the finish and won easily by three lengths from Very Nice Name. In the Arc, Orfevre was made 13/10 favourite in a field of seventeen runners. He was restrained behind the leaders by Soumillon before moving forward in the straight and finished second for the second consecutive year, five length behind the winner Treve. Orfevre missed the Japan Cup and ran his final race in the Arima Kinen on 21 December. In front of a crowd of 124,782, he started the 3/5 favourite against fifteen opponents, with Gold Ship (17/5) being the only horse seriously backed against him. Kenichi Ikezoe restrained the colt in the early stages before moving forward on the final turn. Orfevre took the lead and drew away from the field to win by eight lengths from Win Variation, with Gold Ship in third. Later that evening, Orfevre paraded in front of 60,000 fans in his official retirement ceremony.

At the JRA Awards in January 2013, Orfevre defended JRA Award for Best Older Male Horse with 176 votes, beating sprinter Lord Kanaloa in 104. However, in Japanese Horse of the Year, he only voted in second place to Lord Kanaloa in a 209-69 margin. In the 2013 World's Best Racehorse Rankings Orfevre tied with Wise Dan for third place behind Treve and Black Caviar.

Stud record
Orfevre stands at the Shadai Stallion Station at a service fee of JPY 3,500,000.

Notable progeny

c = colt, f = filly, g = gelding

Pedigree

Orfevre is inbred 3 x 4 to Northern Taste, meaning that this stallion appears in both the third and fourth generations of his pedigree.

See also
 List of historical horses
 St Lite (Japanese first Triple crown in 1941)
 Shinzan (Japanese Triple crown in 1964)
 Mr. C.B. (Japanese Triple crown in 1983)
 Symboli Rudolf (Japanese first undefeated Triple crown in 1984)
 Narita Brian (Japanese Triple crown in 1994)
 Deep Impact (Japanese undefeated Triple crown in 2005)
 Contrail (Japanese undefeated Triple crown in 2020, son of Deep Impact)

References

2008 racehorse births
Racehorses bred in Japan
Racehorses trained in Japan
Triple Crown of Thoroughbred Racing winners
Thoroughbred family 8-c